Siegelbach is located just northwest of the city of Kaiserslautern, in the heart of Germany's Rheinland-Pfalz.  The village, with its 2,600 inhabitants, is included in the urban district (Stadtkreis) of Kaiserslautern, as incorporated in 1969.

The arms of Siegelbach can be viewed at the Heraldri Wiki.

References

Kaiserslautern